The 2016 CIS football season began on August 28 with ten Ontario University Athletics teams playing that day. The season concluded on November 26 with the 52nd Vanier Cup championship at Tim Hortons Field in Hamilton, Ontario. In 2016, 27 university teams were scheduled to play Canadian Interuniversity Sport football, the highest level of amateur Canadian football.

During the 2016 season, CIS adopted the new name of U Sports, with the name change officially taking effect on October 20.

Regular season standings

Top 10 

Ranks in italics are teams not ranked in the top 10 poll but received votes.
NR = Not Ranked, received no votes.
Number in parentheses denotes number votes, after the dash number of first place votes.

Post-season awards

All-Canadian team 

 First team 
Offence
 QB – Noah Picton – Regina
 RB – Tyler Chow – Saskatchewan
 RB – Alex Taylor – Western
 IR – Kaion Julien-Grant – St. Francis Xavier
 IR – Mitchell Picton – Regina
 WR – Louis-Mathieu Normandin – Montreal
 WR – Nathaniel Behar – Carleton
 C – Matthew Van Praet – Western
 G – Geoff Gray – Manitoba
 G – Zach Intzandt – McMaster
 T – Vernon Sainvil – St. Francis Xavier
 T – Jean-Simon Roy – Laval
Defence
 DT – Rupert Butcher – Western
 DT – Vincent Desjardins – Laval
 DE – Mathieu Betts – Laval
 DE – Michael Kashak – McMaster
 LB – DeAndre Smith – Saint Mary's
 LB – D. J. Lalama – Manitoba
 LB – Nakas Onyeka – Laurier
 FS – Stavros Katsantonis – British Columbia
 HB – Malcolm Thompson – Laurier
 HB – Malcolm Brown – Western
 CB – Godfrey Onyeka – Laurier
 CB – Samuel Polan – Sherbrooke
Special teams
 P – Félix Ménard-Brière – Montreal
 K – Sean Stenger – Saskatchewan
 RET – Tunde Adeleke – Carleton
 Second team 
Offence
 QB – Derek Wendel – Ottawa
 RB – Jordan Socholotiuk – St. Francis Xavier
 RB – Jayde Rowe – Carleton
 IR – Austen Hartley – Calgary
 IR – Mitchell Baines – Ottawa
 WR – Dejuan Martin – St. Francis Xavier
 WR – Danny Vandervoort – McMaster
 C – Levi Hua – British Columbia
 G – Samuel Lefebvre – Laval
 G – Ryan Sceviour – Calgary
 T – Evan Johnson – Saskatchewan
 T – Sean Jamieson – Western
Defence
 DT – Donovan Dale – British Columbia
 DT – Junior Luke – Montreal
 DE – Kwaku Boateng – Laurier
 DE – Jonathan Boissonneault-Glaou – Montreal
 LB – Frédéric Chagnon – Montreal
 LB – Jean-Gabriel Poulin – Western
 LB – Alexandre Gagné – Sherbrooke
 FS – Brandon Jennings – Acadia
 HB – Robert Woodson – Calgary
 HB – Adam Auclair – Laval
 CB – Adam Laurensse – Calgary
 CB – Robbie Yochim – McMaster
Special teams
 P – TJ Morton – Toronto
 K – Adam Preocanin – McMaster
 RET – Marcus Davis – UBC

Championships 
The Vanier Cup is played between the champions of the Mitchell Bowl and the Uteck Bowl, the national semi-final games. In 2016, according to the rotating schedule, the Canada West champions host the AUS champions in the Mitchell Bowl and be the home team at the Vanier Cup, while the RSEQ champions host the OUA champions in the Uteck Bowl.

Conference Playoffs

Atlantic University Sport

Réseau du sport étudiant du Québec

Ontario University Athletics

Canada West Universities Athletic Association

National Semifinals

National Championship

References 

2016 in Canadian football
U Sports football seasons